Cressday is a locality in Alberta, Canada.

The locality's name is an amalgamation of the surnames of W. Cresswell and Tony Day, cattlemen.

References 

Localities in Cypress County